Garkolagh or Garr-e Kalagh may refer to:
 Garkolagh Neshin
 Garr-e Kalagh Neshin-e Amirabad